Gornji Kosinj is a village in Perušić municipality, Lika-Senj County, Croatia. It is located Kosinj Valley, near the Lika river. The current population is 192. The Church of Saint Anthony of Padua stands in the village.

References

Populated places in Lika-Senj County